Oliver Spiteri (born 4 July 1970) is a Maltese manager and former footballer who works as head coach for Maltese side Naxxar Lions.

Playing career 
Spiteri was born in Attard. He started playing with his hometown Birkirkara at a young age. He then moved to St. Lucia where he won promotion to the Maltese First Division. Afterward, he joined Żabbar St. Patrick's and again won promotion to the Premier League. After two seasons he moved again to Birkirkara for two seasons. During these two seasons, Birkirkara won all major trophies in Malta and in the 1999–2000 season they were crowned league winners for the first time in their history. Spiteri ended up his career with Lija Athletic, where they won promotion for the Premier League in the 2000–01 season.

Managerial career 
Spiteri's coaching career started with the youth team of Birkirkara. In 2005, he joined Qormi in the Maltese Second Division. However, in October 2006, he was taken by Ray Farrugia as his assistant with Marsaxlokk. The club finished third in the league and Spiteri was appointed head coach of the team for the UEFA Intertoto Cup. In the first game, they obtained a prestigious 1–1 draw on home soil in their first outing against Zrinjski Mostar. From 2006 to 2009, Spiteri was appointed as coach for the Malta national under-17 team, and between 2007 and 2009 served as assistant to Dušan Fitzel with the Maltese national team.

After the national team experience, Spiteri coached numerous out clubs in Malta, including Mosta, Vittoriosa Stars, Balzan, and recently Naxxar Lions.

He is a UEFA A Pro licensed coach.

Honours

As manager 
Malta U17
 FISEC Games Gold Medal: 2008

Mosta
 Maltese First Division: third place 2010–11

Vittoriosa Stars
 Maltese First Division: runner-up 2012–13

Balzan
 Maltese FA Trophy: runner-up 2015–16

References

External links 
 
 
 

1970 births
Living people
People from Attard
Maltese footballers
Association football midfielders
Maltese Premier League players
Birkirkara F.C. players
Lija Athletic F.C. players
Maltese Premier League managers
Maltese football managers
Mosta F.C. managers
Balzan F.C. managers